The Dowse Art Museum is a municipal art gallery in Lower Hutt, New Zealand.

Opening in 1971 in the Lower Hutt CBD, The Dowse occupies a stand-alone building adjacent to other municipal facilities. The building was completely remodelled in 2013. The Dowse's holdings generally focus on New Zealand artists of both national and local significance.

History
The Dowse Art Museum is named after Mayor Percy and Mayoress Mary Dowse, both of whom died prior to the museum opening. Percy Dowse served as the mayor of Hutt City from 1950 to 1970. He was a firm believer in the principle of having physical, social, and cultural facilities in modern cities and he initiated a building phase in the city that saw the construction of landmark buildings such as the War Memorial Library, the Lower Hutt Town Hall, and the Ewen Bridge. He championed the addition of an art gallery to the building spree. His wife, Mary Dowse, was the first president of the Hutt Valley National Council of Women. She was also an ardent supporter of the arts. She teamed up with Elizabeth Harper from The Hutt Art Society, and the duo lobbied the City Council. They succeeded in their endeavor when, in 1963, the Council agreed to provide space for an art gallery. The gallery was originally housed in an extension of the War Memorial Library but after Mary died in a road accident in 1964 the City Council made a unanimous decision to honor her by constructing a new building for the art gallery. The museum was only partially completed when Percy died in 1970.

Directors 
 David Millar was the founding director, heading the museum 1971–1976. He set the direction of the institution, including buying ceramics and decorative arts.
 Jim Barr was director 1976–1981. Under his watch the Dowse's controversial work, Colin McCahon’s Wall of Death was acquired.
 James Mack was director 1981–1988.
 Bob Maysmor was director  1988–1998.
 Tim Walker was director 1998–2008.
 Cam McCracken was director 2008–2012, having had roles at Te Tuhi Centre for the Arts and the Auckland Art Gallery in Auckland and the Waikato Museum of Art and History. He left to become director of the Dunedin Public Art Gallery.
 Courtney Johnston was director 2012–2018, after roles at the National Library of New Zealand and Boost New Media where she worked in communications and web roles.
 Karl Chitham started as director January 2019, having been the director of Tauranga Art Gallery.

Holdings 
Holdings include national figures such as  Ralph Hotere, Colin McCahon, Don Peebles and Gordon Walters as well as locally connected, nationally significant, artists as Rangi Hetet, Rangimārie Hetet, Gordon Crook and Hariata Ropata-Tangahoe. There have been strong exhibitions of modern Maori and Pacific artists and issues. The Dowse has a bust of Carmen Rupe by Paul Rayner and significant collections of jewelry by Alan Preston.

Significant exhibitions
 Casting Light – Ann Robinson – 1998
 Thrift to Fantasy – Rosemary McLeod – 2003
 Respect – Hip Hop Aotearoa – DLT, Upper Hutt Posse, Doug and Joella Wright, and Chris Graham, aka Science – 2003
 Fruits Tokyo Street Style – Shoichi Aoki – 2004
Bill Viola: The Messenger 2010 
Legacy: The Art of Rangi Hetet and Erenora Puketapu-Hetet - 2016. Included kākahu (cloaks) woven by Dame Rangimārie Hetet, Lillian Smallman Hetet and Veranoa Hetet.
Gavin Hipkins: The Domain – 2017–2018

References

External links 

 Blog

New Zealand art
Museums in Lower Hutt
Art museums and galleries in New Zealand
1971 establishments in New Zealand
Art museums established in 1971